Campaign Promises is a 1988 video game published by Front Runner Software Company.

Gameplay
Campaign Promises is a game in which each player selects three campaign promises representing special interests in the United States presidential election.

Reception
Wyatt Lee reviewed the game for Computer Gaming World, and stated that "All in all, Campaign Promises is fast enough to be a good family game; offers enough strategy to intrigue the thinking gamer; provides enough luck to attract the casual gamer; teaches enough valid lessons to make citizens think at election time; and is entertaining enough to make one play it over and over. If one does not want too cerebral a game, but is interested in politics, Campaign Promises has a lot to offer."

References

External links
Review in PC Magazine
Article in the Chicago Tribune

1988 video games